The 1954 French Championships (now known as the French Open) was a tennis tournament that took place on the outdoor clay courts at the Stade Roland-Garros in Paris, France. The tournament ran from 18 May until 30 May. It was the 58th staging of the French Championships, and the second Grand Slam tennis event of 1954. Tony Trabert and Maureen Connolly won the singles titles.

Finals

Men's singles

 Tony Trabert defeated  Art Larsen 6–4, 7–5, 6–1

Women's singles

 Maureen Connolly defeated  Ginette Bucaille 6–4, 6–1

Men's doubles

 Vic Seixas /  Tony Trabert  defeated  Lew Hoad /  Ken Rosewall  6–4, 6–2, 6–1

Women's doubles

 Maureen Connolly /  Nell Hall Hopman defeated  Maud Galtier /  Suzanne Schmitt 7–5, 4–6, 6–0

Mixed doubles

 Maureen Connolly /  Lew Hoad defeated  Jacqueline Patorni /  Rex Hartwig  6–4, 6–3

References

External links
 French Open official website

French Championships
French Championships (tennis) by year
French Championships (tennis)
French Championships (tennis)
May 1954 sports events in Europe